The Kingdom of Haiti was the state established by Henri Christophe on 28 March 1811 when he proclaimed himself King Henri I after having previously ruled as president of the State of Haiti, in the northern part of the country. This was Haiti's second attempt at monarchical rule, as Jean-Jacques Dessalines had previously ruled over the First Empire of Haiti as Emperor Jacques I from 1804 until his assassination in 1806.

During his reign, Henri built six castles, eight palaces (including the Sans-Souci Palace), the Royal Chapel of Milot, and the Citadelle Laferrière, built to protect the Kingdom from possible French invasions. He created a noble class and appointed four princes, eight dukes, 22 counts, 37 barons, and 14 chevaliers.

After suffering a stroke and with support for his rule waning, Henri I committed suicide on 8 October 1820. He was buried at the Citadelle Henry. His 16-year-old son and heir, Jacques-Victor Henri, Prince Royal of Haiti, was murdered 10 days later at the Sans-Souci Palace by rebels.

Following the assassination of Emperor Jacques I, the country was split. Parallel with the government of Christophe in the north, Alexandre Pétion, a free person of color, ruled over the south of the country as President of the Republic of Haiti until his death in 1818. He was succeeded by Jean-Pierre Boyer, who reunited the two parts of the nation after the deaths of Henri I and his son in 1820.

History

Background 
From 1791 to 1804, the Haitian revolution against the French colonists raged. After the failure of the French expedition of 1803, General Jean-Jacques Dessalines proclaimed Haiti's independence.

On 8 October 1804, Dessalines was crowned emperor in Cap-Haïtien under the name of Jacques I.

But very soon, some generals, ambitious to seize power, organized a plot against the emperor, who was finally assassinated by the men of General Alexandre Pétion in an ambush on 17 October 1806, at Pont-Rouge (at the entrance of Port-au-Prince), betrayed by one of his battalion chiefs.

Afterwards, his generals marched on the capital, abolished the Empire and expelled the imperial family, which had to go into exile. Alexandre Pétion proclaimed the Republic and became president. But another general, Henri Christophe, broke away and took control of northern Haiti, where he established a separatist government, the State of the North.

President of the Republic of the North, then president for life and generalissimo, Henri Christophe wanted to legitimize his power as Dessalines had done by re-establishing the empire. In conflict with the southern republic of Pétion, he succeeded, after several battles, in securing the borders of his new state. Once some stability was established, Christophe established a constitutional monarchy with himself as monarch. He became king of Haiti on 28 March 1811, under the name of Henry I. On 2 June 1811, he was crowned by Grand Archbishop Jean-Baptiste-Joseph Brelle.

Conflict with the Republic of the South 
Since Haiti was divided in 1807, tensions arose between the Haitians of the north and the south. This led to a veritable civil war. The tension with the southerners was further intensified with the establishment of the kingdom of the North. Alexandre Pétion, as president of the Republic of the South, declared to represent the struggle against tyranny, which would be represented by King Henri. From 1807 to 1820, neither of the two armies managed to cross the border between the two nations.

As for King Henri, he denigrated Pétion by asserting that Pétion embodied the false democracy that masks tyranny. This declaration was borne out when Pétion proclaimed himself president for life of the South, with the right to designate his successor.

The Revolution of the North

Reasons for the revolt 
In 1818, after Pétion's death, it was his aide-de-camp Jean-Pierre Boyer who succeeded him at the head of the South. King Henri then proposed to Boyer to join him in exchange for the title of marshal. But, as expected, he refused. He even sent several spies to different cities in the North to stir up the population. At first, this attempt seemed to have no effect on the northern population. But after a last battle fought on the north–south border, in which the king ordered to shoot all the southern officers who were prisoners, republican ideas circulated more and more in the kingdom. Boyer then sent several great orators from the South to the North with the aim of creating a revolutionary movement. Moreover, in 1820, the harvests were bad and taxes were increasing, a situation favorable to revolutions.

Uprising and fall 
During the summer of 1820, several riots broke out in the North, and the government then launched a violent repression. As for the king, he suffered a stroke in August 1820, which left him partially paralyzed and considerably weakened his health and disturbed his thinking. In September 1820, a new insurrection broke out in Cap-Haïtien, provoking an almost general revolt in the country. The revolution quickly broke out in the North, the richest city of the kingdom, Cap-Haïtien, fell under revolutionary control. In October, the revolutionaries marched on Milot's Sans Souci palace. Suffering from paralysis and seeing that the situation was slipping away from him, the king committed suicide on 8 October 1820, by shooting himself in the heart with a silver bullet during a mass in a church he had built. He is buried in the Citadelle Laferrière. After his death, his son, Crown Prince Victor-Henry, was proclaimed king by his followers under the name of Henry II. However, Milot was seized by the insurgents and the new king was hanged on 18 October 1820. Queen Marie-Louise Coidavid and her daughters went into exile in Italy. Boyer took advantage of the revolution to send his army, present on the border, to the center of the northern kingdom. On 20 October, Boyer had imposed himself by arms, and proclaimed that the north would be joined with the south on 26 October. Finally, he proclaimed himself president for life and then "supreme chief" of the whole island.

Posterity 
After the episode of the reign of Henri Christophe, no other true monarchy arose in Haiti until the Second Empire of Faustin Soulouque (Faustin I) in 1849–1859. There have been attempts to re-establish the monarchy, however. One such case was that of Pierre Nord Alexis, grandson of the former King Henri, who took power in 1902. An authoritarian, he declared himself president for life and even ended up proposing a new constitutional monarchy with himself as king. But this project provoked a last revolt that turned into a new revolution and forced Nord Alexis to go into exile in 1908. He died two years later, in 1910, at the age of 89.

Government

Difficult beginnings 
In 1811, the North became a constitutional and hereditary monarchy. It was there that it entered into war with the South even though the fighting did not go beyond the borders.

In the beginning, Henri was not a popular monarch, he was seen as an ambitious soldier who had become a dictator. Moreover, in January 1812, he had to face a revolt by liberal groups demanding the establishment of a parliament and a fairer constitution.

To put an end to his troubles, the king established the "Code Henri", which was composed of a set of laws and promoted education. The Henri Code thus established a so-called royal constitution that sought to appease the opponents of the monarchy. In addition, the king set up a cabinet composed of various ministers to help him administer the kingdom. Stability then returned in the North, and Henri was recognized as king by the northern population.

Organization of power 

According to the "Henri Code", the king held the bulk of power. However, he would also be assisted by a cabinet of six ministers, the foremost of whom was a chancellor appointed by the king. When he became king, Henry appointed Joseph Rouanez as chancellor, and also granted him the title of Duke de Morin. Rouanez died in 1812, and was subsequently replaced by Julien Prévost, who served as chancellor until the fall of the regime. The power of the king was much higher than that of the chancellor; the monarch was thus the true head of the government, and the chancellor only his personal advisor.

Nobility system 
With an edict dated 5 April 1811, King Henry proclaimed a noble class whose titles, ecu, and currencies were intended to be transmitted hereditarily. This nobility system was largely inspired by British institutions, but it also showed some French influence; for instance, like Napoleon's nobility, it did not include marquis or viscount. The conferred titles mostly corresponded to majorates, which in this case were vast territories.

Work 

The king used the "agrarian caporalism" that he promoted to develop the island's economy. As a result, the North accumulated wealth faster than the South. Henri built the Sans Souci palace in Milot and the Belle-Rivière palace in Petite Rivière de l'Artibonite and created a nobility distributing titles, pensions, and decorations.

Work on the Sans Souci palace was completed in 1813. In addition to the main body, a chapel with a large cupola was also built, as well as numerous annexes: barracks, a hospital, ministries, a printing shop, a mint, a school, an art academy, and abfarm, etc. King Henri, his wife Queen Marie-Louise, and their children – including Victor-Henry Christophe – lived in the palace, along with their staff and the various councillors and ministers, until the fall of the monarchy on 18 October 1820.

The king owned nineteen other plantations and had other residences and forts built throughout his kingdom, including the La Ferrière citadel, which was located a few kilometers from the palace and armed with 200 cannons. The geographical location of this royal residence and the citadel was chosen for strategic purposes, i.e. it was both central and elevated, as well as concealed and perfectly autonomous. Furthermore, it allowed the sovereign to control his territory and to protect himself from his internal and external enemies, including the French, who still sought to retake their former colony. In fact, the French made an attempted landing on Haiti in 1814–1815 as ordered by King Louis XVIII, sending three commissioners to Haiti, which were quickly rebuked by King Henry I of Haiti.

See also
History of Haiti
 The Royal Chapel of Milot, a religious establishment located in the Sans Souci Palace in Haiti.
Faustin E. Wirkus, reportedly crowned "Faustin II of La Gonave"

References

Flags of the World: Haiti

External links
Constitution of the Kingdom of Haiti

Kingdom of Haiti
Kingdom of Haiti
1810s in Haiti
1820s in Haiti
1811 establishments in Haiti
Kingdom of Haiti
Haiti
Titles of nobility in the Americas
States and territories established in 1811
States and territories disestablished in 1820